Gillian Johnston refers to:

 Murder of Gillian Johnston, a chemist and shop worker from Northern Ireland who was murdered by the IRA, in 1988
 Gillian Johnston (polo player), American polo player and patron